Score was the weekend sports service of the Financial News Network which aired sports-themed programming starting in 1985. It was renamed FNN Sports in 1989 after FNN decided to go with a 24-hour feed on weekdays a year earlier. Score was closed when CNBC bought out FNN in 1991.

Score used a sports ticker or crawl to update scores at the bottom of the screen. As it was partly owned by FNN, a stock ticker was often shown across the bottom of the screen. SCORE provided scores and highlight updates every half-hour.

History

Score launched in April 1985 and was a joint venture of Anheuser-Busch and the Financial News Network. A-B owned the satellite transponder on which FNN broadcast and leased its daytime usage to the network. Prior to the launch of Score, the evening hours were used for a pay service, known as Sports Time, that broadcast primarily in midwestern states and had been established the year before, closing on March 31. A-B contributed to SCORE sets used on Sports Time programming and four on-air personalities that had hosted its studio programming: Bill Brown, Byron Day, John Loesing and Todd Donoho.

Score ceased broadcasting on weekdays in September 1988 to allow FNN to broadcast during prime time; it gained some weekend hours that had been occupied by home shopping service Telshop. The block became known as FNN: Sports in 1989. When CNBC acquired FNN in 1991, FNN: Sports was dropped in favor of the weekend talk programming on CNBC.

Programming
Score had several shows that were televised versions of what sports talk radio is today.  Score featured some professional sporting events, live call-in shows, and sports news shows.  Live sporting events included professional wrestling, MISL soccer, college basketball, the CFL and boxing.  It also broadcast a couple NASCAR races in 1988 that were originally slated for SETN before it folded.

It also showed at least two games of the 1986 National Invitation Tournament.

Call-in shows, including Time Out for Trivia
Its most popular show was Time Out for Trivia, hosted by Todd Donoho and produced by Eric Corwin. Time Out For Trivia was the first national live interactive game show in which viewers phoned in and if they correctly answered a question, they'd win a prize. One of the most popular prizes on the show was the Dirt Devil vacuum cleaner which often included a funny sound effect like an "ooooh" or an "oooooh.... aaaaaah." Humor was almost always an ingredient, particularly in the multiple-choice questions, which often included an obvious nonsports figure as one of the possible answers.

Time Out For Trivia became a cult hit on cable TV, receiving many glowing reviews in newspapers and magazines. Gary Nuhn, a columnist for the Dayton Daily News, has called TOFT "cable TV at its best," and Wendell Barnhouse, radio/TV columnist for the Fort Worth Star-Telegram, says it is "one of life's joys." Sports Illustrated did a feature about TOFT in its famous swimsuit issue. Donoho and Corwin did over 1,000 shows together, including a 1,000th show "special edition", a one-hour program which featured highlights from the first 999 shows. Donoho and Corwin worked together on TOFT and other shows at FNN/SCORE from 1985 through 1989 before joining the sports department at KABC. The show was then renamed Sports Zone with host Rob Fukuzaki and it remained an MNF postgame show until the package left ABC after the 2005 season. Sports Zone remains on KABC, following many events televised by the network.

Other call-in shows included The Fan Speaks Out, The Final Score, and The Sports Collector.

News programs
News shows featured included Tennis Talk, a baseball program called The Hot Stove League, and a sports wagering program with Wayne Root. Other hosts included Bill Brown, Byron Day, John Loesing, Hugh Malay and Fred Wallin. Many of the shows were directed by Brad Toberman. Show producers included Jim Battey, Michael Pierce, Steven Herbert, Gary Kubik, Hugh Malay, Eric Corwin and Steven Friedman.

Professional wrestling
The professional wrestling programming exposed fans throughout the country to regional territory wrestling promotions. These territories included the Mid-Atlantic with Ric Flair and Chief Wahoo McDaniel, Memphis with Jerry 'the King' Lawler, Texas with the Von Erichs and the Maivia family's Hawaii promotion with Rocky Johnson, King Curtis, Don Muraco, Lars Anderson, Superfly Snuka, Bruiser Brody and many Japanese wrestlers.  It also prominently featured wrestling from the Continental Wrestling Federation including matches featuring Eddie Gilbert, Tom Prichard, and The Dirty White Boy.

Management 
President: Arnie Rosenthal

References

Defunct television networks in the United States
Canadian Football League on television
Joint ventures
NASCAR on television
Tennis on television
English-language television stations in the United States
Television channels and stations established in 1985
Television channels and stations disestablished in 1991
Television channel articles with incorrect naming style
1985 establishments in Canada